Nicholas Denton is a writer and Australian stage and screen actor.

Career
In 2017 Denton appeared with Lucy Moir in  the John Kolvenbach play Love Song at the Melbourne Fringe Festival. He also appeared as Billy Bibbit in a version of One Flew Over The Cuckoo’s Nest at the South Bank Theatre in Melbourne. In 2018 Denton appeared in the play Wild by Mike Bartlett for the Melbourne Theatre Company, a role loosely based on whistle-blower Edward Snowden. According to Time Out Denton "navigates the shift in status beautifully" of the main character.

Denton appeared in the Australian TV series Glitch. Denton co-wrote with Bonnie Moir and appeared with Richard Moir in the short film Not Dark Yet. Denton played the son of a man with a degenerate disease. The film was premiered at the 2022 Melbourne International Film Festival.
 
Denton beat 200 or so actors to the role of Vicomte de Valmont in the television production  of Dangerous Liaisons after passing a number of auditions and screen tests beginning in early 2020. The process was not straight forward, Denton's sister had to read parts with him during quarantine and COVID-19 lockdown which, given the nature of the scenes between Marquise de Merteuil and the Vicomte de Valmont, he described to the New York Times as "Disgusting. Bless her soul". Also, he an Englert had to do scenes together in different hotel rooms over Zoom and didn't meet in person until on set in Prague in 2021. Denton said he found the costumes from the period altered his posture by positioning his spine at a stricter angle. Denton described the sex scenes in the production as "not sex for the sake of sex. It's not gratuitous. It's actually quite beautifully emotional."

Selected filmography

References

External links

Living people
Australian actors
Australian male film actors
People from Melbourne
Year of birth missing (living people)